Cache County is a county located in the Wasatch Front region of Utah. As of the 2020 United States Census the population was 133,154. Its county seat and largest city is Logan. Cache County is included in Logan metropolitan area.

History
Indigenous peoples occupied the valleys of present Cache County as much as 10,000 BCE. Near the present epoch, the valley served the Plains Indians and the Shoshone. Trappers and explorers visited the area in the late 18th and early 19th centuries. John Henry Weber and Jim Bridger came through in 1824; Peter Skene Ogden and James Beckwourth passed through in 1825. 

In July 1855, a group of settlers from the LDS Church drove a herd of cattle into the valley and camped at Haw Bush Spring (present Elkhorn Ranch). However, the cold winter drove the settlers back to the Salt Lake Valley. Peter Maughan, who had requested better land for agriculture for the families of his settlement in Lake Point, Utah, was called by President Brigham Young to establish a new settlement in the Cache Valley. On September 15, 1856 he established Maughan's Fort, which grew into present day Wellsville. More settlers arrived in the valley, and by 1859 the settlements of Providence, Mendon, Logan, Richmond, and Smithfield had been established.

In preparation for this influx, the Utah Territory legislature created a county, effective January 5, 1856, with seats and government incomplete. By April 4, 1857, the organization was completed, and Logan became the seat. It was named for the fur stashes, known in French as Caches, made by many of the Rocky Mountain Fur Company trappers. The county gained area in 1862 when its boundary lines with adjacent counties were adjusted. In 1863, the federal government enacted the Idaho Territory, which administratively removed the described portions of Cache County that lay north of the territorial border. Then in 1864, the east part of the county was partitioned to become Rich County. The borders of Cache County have remained in their present state since 1864.

A rail line between Brigham City and Logan was completed in 1873 (Utah and Northern Railway). The line was extended into Idaho, and a connection was made to the transcontinental railroad, which opened the world to Cache County; their crops (especially grain and dairy) began moving to broader markets. The county's sheep population also burgeoned, from 10,000 in 1880 to 300,000 by 1900. By 1900 the Forest Service began regulating grazing practices, which brought the sheep population under control.

There were 16,000 dairy cows in Cache County in 1910. Commercial creameries, flour mills, woolen mills, and knitting factories developed around the farm-based economy. Cache presently continues as the state's leader in dairy products and as a major producer of hay, alfalfa, and grain.

Geography
Cache County lies on the north edge of Utah. Its north border abuts the south border of the state of Idaho. On the western edge of the county are the Wellsville Mountains and on the eastern edge are the Bear River Mountains, both northern branches of the Wasatch Range. The Cache Valley reaches north to the state border. The Bear River Mountains, the northernmost extension of the Wasatch Range, cover the eastern half of the county. The Bear River flows through Cache Valley.

Major highways

 U.S. Highway 89
 U.S. Highway 91
 State Route 23
 State Route 30
 State Route 101
 State Route 142
 State Route 165
 State Route 200
 State Route 218
 State Route 252

Adjacent counties

 Oneida County, Idaho - northwest
 Franklin County, Idaho - north
 Bear Lake County, Idaho - northeast
 Rich County - east
 Weber County - south
 Box Elder County - west

Protected areas

 Cache National Forest (part)
 Caribou National Forest (part)
 Hardware Ranch Wildlife Management Area (state park)
 Tony Grove Lake Campground (US Forest Service)
 Millville Face Wildlife Management Area

Lakes

 Crescent Lake
 Cutler Reservoir
 Hyrum Reservoir
 Newton Reservoir
 Porcupine Reservoir
 Tony Grove Lake

Government and politics
Cache County is governed by a seven-member county council and also elects eight officials at large. As of 2019, all county elected officials were members of the Republican Party.

Like most of Utah, Cache County is strongly Republican in presidential elections. The last time it voted for a Democratic presidential candidate was 1944.

Demographics

2010 census
As of the 2010 United States Census, there were 112,655 people, 34,722 households, and 26,464 families in the county. The population density was 96.7/sqmi (37.35/km2). There were 37,024 housing units at an average density of 31.78/sqmi (12.28/km2). The racial makeup of the county was 89.12% White, 0.62% Black or African American, 0.61% Native American, 1.88% Asian, 0.39% Pacific Islander, 5.48% from other races, and 1.90% from two or more races. 9.96% of the population was Hispanic or Latino of any race.

There were 34,722 households, out of which 41.34% had children under 18 living with them, 76.22% were married couples living together, 7.73% had a female householder with no husband present, and 23.78% were non-families. 16.30% of all households were made up of individuals, and 5.54% had someone living alone who was 65 years of age or older. The average household size was 3.14, and the average family size was 3.55.

The county population contained 36.3% under the age of 20, 12.59% from 20 to 24, 26.97% from 25 to 44, 16.41% from 45 to 64, and 7.72% who were 65 years of age or older. The median age was 25.5 years. For every 100 females, there were 98.84 males. For every 100 females aged 18 and over, there were 99.53 males.

2015
As of 2015, the largest self-reported ancestry groups in Cache County were:

27.9% were of English ancestry
12.1% were of German ancestry
7.3% were of Danish ancestry.
6.1% were of American ancestry
5.2% were of Swedish ancestry
5.0% were of Scottish ancestry
4.5% were of Irish ancestry
3.0% were of Norwegian ancestry
2.6% were of Welsh ancestry
2.1% were of Italian ancestry
2.0% were of Swiss ancestry
2.0% were of Dutch ancestry
1.5% were of French ancestry
0.7% were of Polish ancestry

2016
As of 2016, the largest self-reported ancestry groups in Cache County were:

28.3% were of English ancestry
11.6% were of German ancestry
7.4% were of Danish ancestry.
5.9% were of American ancestry
5.3% were of Swedish ancestry
5.1% were of Scottish ancestry
4.6% were of Irish ancestry
2.9% were of Norwegian ancestry
2.7% were of Welsh ancestry
2.2% were of Italian ancestry
2.2% were of Swiss ancestry
1.8% were of French ancestry
1.7% were of Dutch ancestry
0.8% were of Polish ancestry

Communities

Cities

 Hyde Park
 Hyrum
 Lewiston
 Logan (county seat)
 Mendon
 Millville
 Nibley
 North Logan
 Providence
 Richmond
 River Heights
 Smithfield
 Wellsville

Towns

 Amalga
 Clarkston
 Cornish
 Newton
 Paradise
 Trenton

Townships
 College-Young (merger of the unincorporated communities of College Ward and Young Ward)

Census-designated places

 Avon
 Benson
 Cache (aka Cache Junction)
 Cove
 Petersboro

Unincorporated communities
 White Horse Village

Former communities
 La Plata

Education

School districts
 Cache County School District
 Logan City School District

Universities
 Utah State University (public)
 Bridgerland Technical College (public)

Gallery

See also

 National Register of Historic Places listings in Cache County, Utah

References

External links

 
 Cache Valley Tourism Council

 
1857 establishments in Utah Territory
Populated places established in 1857